The First Year is a 1926 American silent comedy film directed by Frank Borzage and starring Matt Moore, Katherine Perry, John Patrick, Frank Currier, and Frank Cooley. It is based on the 1920 play of the same name by Frank Craven. The film was released by Fox Film Corporation on January 24, 1926.

Plot
As described in a film magazine review, Tom and Grace Tucker have been married a year. Grace is discontented and wishes they had more money. Tom consoles her by the promise of what he will achieve by a prospective big business deal. He invites Mr. and Mrs. Barstow to dinner and has the former all hooked up for a real estate killing. Mr. Barstow is a railroad executive while his wife is a former showgirl. However, the inexperience of their maid Hattie makes the dinner less than ideal, and the arrival of Dick Loring and a chance conversational slip by Grace threatens to spoil the deal. Grace and Tom quarrel, and she leaves to go to her mother. Tom gets drunk, but closes the deal with Mr. Barstow, follows his wife, and they are reconciled.

Cast

Preservation
Prints of The First Year exists at the Museum of Modern Art and George Eastman House.

References

External links

Still from moma.org

1926 comedy films
Silent American comedy films
1926 films
American silent feature films
American black-and-white films
Fox Film films
American films based on plays
Films directed by Frank Borzage
1920s American films